Peter David Nellist,  is a British physicist and materials scientist, currently a professor in the Department of Materials at the University of Oxford. He is noted for pioneering new techniques in high-resolution electron microscopy.

Early life and career

Nellist gained his B.A. (1991), M.A. (1995) and Ph.D (1996) from St John's College, Cambridge, and studied at the Cavendish Laboratory with John Rodenburg, before taking up post-doctoral research at Oak Ridge National Laboratory (ORNL) in Tennessee with ex-Cavendish researcher Stephen Pennycook. Eighteen months later, Nellist returned to Cambridge on a Royal Society University Research Fellowship, which he transferred to the University of Birmingham. He left academia for four years to work for another ex-Cambridge microscopy pioneer, Ondrej Krivanek, at Nion, his newly formed company in Seattle. Nellist then returned to the University of Dublin and finally to the University of Oxford, where he became Joint Head of the Department of Materials in 2019.

Scientific research

Nellist's research focuses on scanning transmission electron microscopy and its use in materials science. In particular, he is noted for work on electron ptychography, quantitative image interpretation, and the development of corrective electron microscope lenses, which he describes as "like spectacles for a microscope". In 1998, working with Stephen Pennycook of ORNL, he recorded "the highest resolution microscope images ever made of crystal structures".

Achievements and awards

Nellist has won many awards, including the 2007 Burton Medal from the Microscopy Society of America for "an exceptional contribution to microscopy", the 2013 Ernst Ruska Prize from the German Electron Microscopy Society for the development of confocal electron microscopy, the 2013 Birks Award from the Microbeam Analysis Society, and the 2016 and 2020 European Microscopy Society prizes for best published paper in materials science. He was elected a Fellow of the Royal Society in 2020. He is the vice-president of the Royal Microscopical Society (of which he was also made an Honorary Fellow in 2020) and a board member of the European Microscopy Society.

Selected publications

Books

Scientific papers

References

External links

 
 Seeing is Believing: How observing atoms in the electron microscope helps develop tomorrow's materials: A schools outreach talk by Peter Nellist explaining his work on electron microscopy.

Living people
Year of birth missing (living people)
Alumni of St John's College, Cambridge
Alumni of the University of Birmingham
Fellows of the Royal Society
British materials scientists
Microscopists
English physicists